The Hills Have Eyes is an American horror franchise that consists of four slasher films, a graphic novel and merchandise.  It may also refer to:

In film
 Films from the franchise:
 The Hills Have Eyes (1977 film), an American horror film written, directed, and edited by Wes Craven
 The Hills Have Eyes Part II, a 1984 American horror film written and directed by Wes Craven
 The Hills Have Eyes (2006 film), an American horror film and remake of Wes Craven's 1977 film of the same name
 The Hills Have Eyes 2, a 2007 American horror film, and the sequel to the 2006 film which was a remake of the 1977 horror film
 Mind Ripper (also The Hills Have Eyes III), a horror film released on HBO in 1995

In music
 "The Hills Have Eyes", the sixth track from Stratovarius' 1992 album Twilight Time
 "The Hills Have Eyes", the sixth track from Electric Wizard's 2000 album Dopethrone
 "The Hills Have Eyes", the second track from The Acacia Strain's 2010 album Wormwood